was a Japanese politician and longtime member of the Imperial Diet as a member of the Rikken Minseito party. He was born in the village of Izushi-gun in Hyōgo and in the Diet represented the rural Tajima area.

In the 1890s, he studied at Waseda University (then known as Tōkyō Senmon Gakkō), where he was one the few to pass the bar examinations. He later briefly studied at Yale, but after a lengthy decline in health, he turned from academics to politics.

He served in the National Diet almost continuously since his first election in 1912. He acquired a reputation as a "clean" candidate, who favored universal male suffrage and constitutionalism.

In the 1930s, he developed a reputation as an opponent of the emerging militaristic policies and its hypocritical slogans. However, he was a conservative who did not object on principles to the Meiji order and the military, and he opposed state intervention in economic matters unlike those with fascist or socialist tendencies.

On February 2, 1940, he made a speech in which he sharply questioned the prosecution and justification of Japan's "holy war" in China, and he stressed the importance of political pragmatism over idealism and lofty notions. That caused the Diet to vote overwhelmingly for his expulsion on March 7, 1940.

Many of those who opposed him were reformists and progressives like Inejirō Asanuma, who would later become a prominent Japan Socialist Party leader. His speech also led to the creation of the League of Diet Members Believing the Objectives of the Holy War by Fumimaro Konoe, who was his main target. Saitō was easily re-elected to the Diet in 1942, one indication of his popularity among his constituents.

After the surrender of Japan in 1945, he was one of the politicians that participated in the Allied Occupation's efforts to democratize Japan.

See also 
 Opposition at home to the Japanese government (World War II)

References

External links 
 Saito, Takao at National Diet Library, Japan
 

1870 births
1949 deaths
Japanese people of World War II
Rikken Minseitō politicians
Members of the House of Representatives (Empire of Japan)
People expelled from public office
Politicians from Hyōgo Prefecture